Sagitella is a genus of annelids belonging to the family Typhloscolecidae.

The genus has almost cosmopolitan distribution.

Species:

Sagitella bobretzkii 
Sagitella kowalewskii 
Sagitella praecox

References

Annelids